Iowa Raptors FC are a soccer club based in Cedar Rapids, Iowa, United States. They were established in 2019 as a men's team, and formed their women's team in 2021.

Their men's team compete in the Midwest Division of United Premier Soccer League and in the Midwest Premier League. They began play in the 2021 UPSL season playing at Prairie High School's stadium. They had initially been set to join USL League Two for 2021, before switching to the UPSL. The men's team won the 2020 Heartland Super Cup.

Iowa Raptors FC also has a women's team, competing in the Women's Premier Soccer League since the 2022 season.

Beginning in the fall of 2022, Iowa Raptors FC will have an indoor team that will compete as members of the Major Arena Soccer League 2.

Roster

Women's

References

 
Association football clubs established in 2020
Soccer clubs in Iowa
Sports in Cedar Rapids, Iowa
2020 establishments in Iowa